Zev van Melick (born 16 January 1997) is a Dutch footballer who plays as a midfielder for Hoofdklasse club EHC Hoensbroek.

Club career
He made his professional debut in the Eerste Divisie for MVV Maastricht on 11 December 2015 in a game against RKC Waalwijk.

References

External links
 
 Zev van Melick at Footballdatabase

1997 births
Footballers from Arnhem
Living people
Dutch footballers
Dutch expatriate footballers
MVV Maastricht players
EHC Hoensbroek players
Eerste Divisie players
Vierde Divisie players
Association football midfielders
Dutch expatriate sportspeople in Belgium
Expatriate footballers in Belgium